Petrovsky is a surname.

Petrovsky (masculine), Petrovskaya (feminine) or Petrovskoye (neuter) may also refer to:

 Petrovsky Boulevard, Moscow, Russia
 Petrovsky Stadium, St. Petersburg, Russia, a stadium used mainly for football
 Petrovsky Island, St. Petersburg, Russia
 Petrovsky (inhabited locality), various places in Russia, includes places named Petrovskaya and Petrovskoye
 Petrovsky District, Saratov Oblast, Russia
 Petrovsky District, Stavropol Krai, Russia
 Petrovsky District, Tambov Oblast, Russia
 Petrovsky District, Donetsk, a city district of Donetsk, Ukraine
 Petrovskaya Tower, part of the Moscow Kremlin
 5319 Petrovskaya, an asteroid

See also
 Petrovsk (disambiguation)
 Novopetrovsk (disambiguation)
 Novopetrovsky (disambiguation)